Steve Albini is an American musician, audio engineer and music journalist, whose many recording projects have exerted an important influence on independent music since the 1980s. Most of his projects from 1997 onwards were recorded at the Electrical Audio studios in Chicago. Albini is occasionally credited as a record producer, though he dislikes the term to describe his work, preferring the term "recording engineer" when credited, and refuses to take royalties from bands recording in his studio, as he feels it would be unethical to do so.

As a musician, Albini has fronted the bands Big Black, Rapeman and Shellac on guitar and vocals. He also played on other projects from time to time, notably as a bass guitarist the touring incarnation of Pete Conway's solo project Flour whose records he also engineered.

The list is in chronological order by date of release, but is incomplete.

As a musician

Big Black, 1982–1987
Lungs EP (Ruthless) (1982)
Bulldozer EP (Ruthless/Fever/Touch and Go) (1983/1983/1992)
Racer-X EP (Homestead/Touch and Go) (1984/1992)
 "Rema-Rema" 7-inch (Forced Exposure) (1985)
The Hammer Party (Homestead) (1985) - Compilation
 "Il Duce" / "Big Money" 7-inch (Homestead) (1985)
Atomizer (Homestead) (1986)
Sound of Impact LP (Not, Not) (1987) - Live
 "Heartbeat" 7-inch (Touch and Go) (1987)
Headache EP (Touch and Go) (1987)
 "He's A Whore / "The Model" 7-inch (Touch and Go) (1987)
The Incredibly Corporate Whorish Big Black Interview Album LP (Touch and Go Records) (1987)
    (aka Talk About Fucking) (Blast First! UK)
Songs About Fucking (Touch and Go/Torso/Blast First) (1987,2018/1987/1987)
Peel Sessions 4-song 7-inch (1988)
The Rich Man's Eight Track Tape (Homestead) (1987)
Pigpile MC/CD/VHS (Touch and Go) (1987, released 1992)

Rapeman, 1987–1989
 "Hated Chinee" / "Marmoset" 7-inch (Touch and Go) (1988)
 Budd EP (Blast First/Touch and Go) (1988/2007) 
 Two Nuns and a Pack Mule LP (Touch and Go/Supernatural Organization/Torso/Blast First) (1988) 
 "Inki's Butt Crack b/w Song Number One" 7-inch (Sub Pop Singles Club 7-inch) (1989)

Shellac, 1992–present
 The Rude Gesture: A Pictorial History 7-inch (Touch and Go) (1993)
  Uranus 7-inch (Touch and Go) (1993)
The Bird Is the Most Popular Finger 7-inch (Drag City) (1994)
At Action Park (Touch and Go) (1994) 
 Live in Tokyo CD (NUX Organization) (1994) - Live, Japan-only
 "Billiardspielerlied" / "Mantel" 7-inch (Überschall Records) (1995)
 "95 Jailbreak" on Sides 1-4 2×7″ (1995, Skin Graft) (1995) - Compilation
 "Rambler Song" on The Soul Sound Single split 7-inch with Mule (Touch and Go) (1997)
 The Futurist/Movement LP (private release) (1997)
Terraform (Touch and Go) (1998/2010) 
1000 Hurts (Touch and Go) (2000) 
 "Agostino" on split 7-inch with Caesar (Barbaraal) (2001) 
Excellent Italian Greyhound (Touch and Go) (2007) 
Dude Incredible (Touch and Go) (2014) 
The End Of Radio (14 July 1994 Peel Session / 1 December 2004 Peel Session) 2XLP+CD, 2XCD (Touch and Go) (2019)

As an audio engineer

1980s
1985
Dark Arts – A Long Way from Brigadoon (1985) (released on Albini's Ruthless Records label)
End Result – Ward 12-inch E.P. (1985) (released on Ruthless Records)
1986
Urge Overkill – Strange, I... (1986) (credited as "Li'l Weed")
Blatant Dissent – Hold the Fat LP, Dreams 7-inch (1986) (credited as "Robert Earl Hughes")
1987
Slint – Tweez (1987) (credited as "some fuckin' derd niffer") Slint - Tweez
The Membranes – Kiss Ass... Godhead! (1987)
1988
Pixies – Surfer Rosa (1988)
UrgeOverKilldozer a/k/a Kill and Kill Again – Evil Womyn (1988) (collaboration between Killdozer and Urge Overkill released on Tinnitus Records' Mondo Stereo compilation)
Urge Overkill – Jesus Urge Superstar (1988)
Bitch Magnet – Star Booty (1988) (mix only but credited as producer)
Tar – Play to Win 7-inch (1988)
Head of David – Dustbowl (1988)
Flour LP (1988)
Gore – Wrede (The Cruel Peace) (1988)
1989
Poster Children – Flower Plower (1989) (first four songs; others recorded by Iain Burgess)
Tar – Handsome EP (1989)
Ut – Griller (1989)
The Jesus Lizard – Pure (1989)
Sixteen Tons – 4 Songs (1989)
Wreck – Wreck 12-inch EP (1989)
Bliss – Grafted to an elbow LP (1989)
Pussy Galore – Dial 'M' for Motherfucker (1989)
Boss Hog – Drinkin', Lechin' & Lyin' 12-inch EP (1989)

1990s
1990
The Breeders – Pod
Boss Hog – Cold Hands
Flour – Luv 713
Sixteen Tons – Headshot
The Jesus Lizard – Head
Tad – Salt Lick/God's Balls
Whitehouse – Thank Your Lucky Stars (co-produced with William Bennett)
Wreck – Soul Train
Pigface – Gub (Albini also plays guitar, bass, and oscillator on some tracks)
Hum – Is Like Kissing an Angel (She Said) demo tape
1991
Cath Carroll – England Made Me
Cheer-Accident – Dumb Ask
Drunk Tank – Drunk Tank
The Didjits – Full Nelson Reilly (credited as Reggie Stiggs)
Poster Children – Daisychain Reaction
Sandy Duncan's Eye – Sandy Duncan's Eye
Zeni Geva – Total Castration
The Wedding Present – Seamonsters
The Mark of Cain – Incoming
The Jesus Lizard – Goat
Chris Connelly – Whiplash Boychild (credited as assistant engineer; also contributed some guitar)
Superchunk – No Pocky for Kitty (uncredited)
Silverfish – Fat Axl
Wreck – House of Boris
Tar – Jackson LP
Volcano Suns – Career in Rock
Urge Overkill – The Supersonic Storybook
1992
Things That Fall Down – Disbelief
Various Artists – Follow Our Trax, Vol. 8: Another Disc, Another Planet
Bewitched – Harshing My Mellow
Jon Spencer Blues Explosion – The Jon Spencer Blues Explosion
The Jesus Lizard – Liar (uncredited)
Helmet – Meantime (song "In The Meantime" recorded by Albini; mixed by Andy Wallace)
Mule – "Mule" (credited as Lenard Johns)
Thrillhammer – Giftless
Failure – Comfort
Braindamage – Signal de Revolta
Zeni Geva – Nai-Ha
Murder, Inc. – Murder, Inc.
Crain – Speed
Union Carbide Productions – Swing
Whitehouse – Twice Is Not Enough (track "Neronia" only; co-produced with William Bennett)
Dazzling Killmen – Dig Out The Switch
Distorted Pony – Punishment Room (credited as bespectacled wisp of a fellow from the midwest)
Fugazi – In on the Kill Taker (unofficial recording only, band chose to go with different producers for official release)
Peter Sotos – Buyer's Market
1993
Crow – My Kind Of Pain
Engine Kid – Bear Catching Fish (uncredited)
Craw – Craw (uncredited)
Don Caballero – "Our Caballero" b/w "My Ten Year Old Lady Is Giving It Away"  (a-side only, uncredited)
Don Caballero – "Andandandandandandandand" b/w "First Hits" (uncredited)
Don Caballero – For Respect (uncredited)
PJ Harvey – Rid of Me (Albini recorded all but one song)
Jawbreaker – 24 Hour Revenge Therapy (uncredited or credited as "Fluss")
Nirvana – In Utero
Shadowy Men on a Shadowy Planet – Sport Fishin': The Lure of the Bait, The Luck of the Hook
King Cobb Steelie (unofficial recording only, band chose to go with different producer for official release)
Mule – "Wrung EP"
Shorty – "Thumb Days"
Silkworm – His Absence Is a Blessing single
Tar – Toast
Urbn DK – Denial (uncredited)
Usherhouse – Molting 
Zeni Geva – Desire for Agony
Zeni Geva – All Right You Little Bastards (live album, Albini  plays guitar)
Various Artists – 1993 Mercury Music Prize: Shortlist Sampler
Various Artists – The Beavis and Butt-Head Experience
Various Artists – Whip
1994
Big'n – Cutthroat (credited as "Buck Naked")
Red Krayola – The Red Krayola (W/Bob Weston and Brian Paulson) not credited on album
Slint – untitled (uncredited)
Space Streakings – 7-Toku (mix only)
Dazzling Killmen – Face of Collapse
Whitehouse – Halogen (co-produced with William Bennett)
Silkworm – In the West
Various Artists – Insurgent Country, Vol. 1: For a Life of Sin
Silkworm – Libertine
The Jesus Lizard – Down
Melt-Banana – Speak Squeak Creak
Craw – Lost Nation Road
Crow – My Kind of Pain
Mule – "If I Don't Six"
Morsel – Noise Floor
Brise-Glace – When in Vanitas (uncredited)
Brise-Glace – In Sisters all and Felony 7-inch
Various Artists – You Got Lucky: Tom Petty Tribute
Six Finger Satellite – Machine Cuisine
johnboy – claim dedications
Breadwinner – Burner
Souls – tjitchhischtsiy
The Lizard Train – Everything Moves
The Lizard Train – Inertia
1995
Uzeda – 4
Faucet – Bleeding Head
Lizard Music – Fashionably Lame
Zeni Geva – Freedom Bondage
Killdozer – God Hears Pleas of the Innocent
Various Artists – Homage: Lots of Bands Doing Descendents's Songs
Gaunt – I Can See Your Mom From Here
Superchunk – Incidental Music 1991–95
Various Artists – Insurgent Country, Vol. 2: Hell-Bent
Screeching Weasel – Kill the Musicians
18th Dye – Tribute to a Bus
The Fleshtones – Laboratory of Sound
The Drovers – Little High Sky Show
Martians – Low Budget Stunt King
Various Artists – A Means to an End: The Music of Joy Division
Gastr del Sol – Mirror Repair EP
Tar – Over and Out
The Amps – Pacer (Not credited, not all songs)
Sloy – Plug
Man or Astro-man? – Project Infinity
Whitehouse – Quality Time (co-produced with William Bennett)
Tony Conrad – Slapping Pythagoras
Palace Music – Viva Last Blues
Oxbow – Let Me Be a Woman (recorded 1993)
Yona-Kit – Yona-Kit
Melt-Banana – Scratch or Stitch
Thrush Hermit -The Great Pacific Ocean EP
1996
The Auteurs – After Murder Park
Laurels – L
Palace Music – Arise Therefore
Oxbow – Serenade in Red (European release)
Rosa Mota – Bionic
Robbie Fulks – Country Love Songs
Big'n – Discipline Through Sound (credited as "Inibla Nevets")
Silkworm – Firewater
Bodychoke – Five Prostitutes
A Minor Forest – Flemish Altruism (Constituent Parts 1993–1996) (about every other track)
Phono-Comb – Fresh Gasoline
Brainiac – Hissing Prigs in Static Couture
Dis- – Historically Troubled Third Album
Splendorbin – Stealth
Stinking Lizaveta – Hopelessness & Shame
Various Artists – In Defense of Animals, Vol. 2
The Union – In Terminus GA, 1997 (some vocals recorded and some songs mixed by David Barbe)
Various Artists – Jabberjaw Compilation, Vol. 2: Pure Sweet Hell
Fred Schneider – Just Fred
Smog – Kicking a Couple Around EP
Mandingo – Macho Grande
Cheer-Accident – Not a Food
Ativin – Pills vs. Planes
Sloy – Planet of Tubes
Bush – Razorblade Suitcase
Dazzling Killmen – Recuerda (three songs only)
The Mark of Cain – Rock & Roll
Various Artists – Shots in the Dark
Nirvana – Singles
Shakuhachi Surprise – Space Streakings Sighted Over Mount Shasta
Les Thugs – Strike
Bush – "Swallowed" single
Hubcap – Those Kids Are Weirder
Low – Transmission EP (Albini also contributed some illustrations)
Scrawl – Travel On, Rider
Guided by Voices – Under the Bushes Under the Stars (two songs only, credited to "Fluss")
Vent 414 – Vent 414
Killdozer & Ritual Device – When the Levee Breaks
Veruca Salt – Blow It Out Your Ass It's Veruca Salt
Burning Witch – Towers...
Wuhling – Extra 6
1997
Souls – Bird fish or inbetween
Bokomolech – Jet Lag, LP
Cheap Trick – "Baby Talk" b/w "Brontosaurus" single
Cheap Trick – unreleased re-recording of In Color
Craw – Map, Monitor, Surge
Darling Little Jackhammer – Criminally Easy To Please
Ein Heit – Lightning and the Sun
Great Unraveling – Great Unraveling
Oxbow – Serenade in Red (US release; recorded 1996)
Pegboy – Cha Cha Damore
Pixies – Death to the Pixies
P. W. Long's Reelfoot – We Didn't See You on Sunday
Silkworm – Developer
Solar Race – Homespun
Spider Virus – Electric Erection
Storm & Stress – Storm & Stress
Various Artists – Guide to Fast Living, Vol. 2
Various Artists - The Jackal
Dianogah– As Seen from Above
La Gritona – Arrasa Con Todo (1997)
1998
Pansy Division – Absurd Pop Song Romance
Pedro, Muriel & Esther – The White To Be Angry
Jon Spencer Blues Explosion – Acme
Ballydowse – The Land, The Bread, And The People
Young Dubliners – Alive Alive O
Silver Apples – Beacon
Uzeda – Different Section Wires
Silkworm – Even a Blind Chicken Finds a Kernel of Corn: 1990–1994
Eclectics – Idle Worship
Will Oldham – Little Joya
Pansy Division – More Lovin' from Our Oven
Plush – More You Becomes You
Whitehouse – Mummy and Daddy (track "Private" only)
Dirty Three – Ocean Songs
The Sadies – Precious Moments
Various Artists – Smash Your Radio: Jump Up! Sampler
Bert – Bert (Pinebox Records)
Cordelia's Dad – Spine
The Ex – Starters Alternators
The Traitors – Traitors
Dirty Three – Ufkuko
Joel RL Phelps and the Downer Trio – 3
Jimmy Page & Robert Plant – Walking into Clarksdale
Mount Shasta – Watch Out (credited as "Debbie Albini")
Vandal X – Songs from the Heart
Bedhead – Transaction de Novo
.22 – Watertown EP
1999
Teenage Frames – 1% Faster
Fun People – The Art(e) of Romance
Chisel Drill Hammer – Chisel Drill Hammer
Early Lines – Are Tired Beasts
Filibuster – Deadly Hifi
Jon Spencer Blues Explosion – Emergency Call from Japan
Neurosis – Times of Grace
The Bollweevils – History of the Bollweevils, Vol. 2
Distortion Felix – I'm an Athlete
Ensimi – BMX
Murder, Inc. – Locate Subvert Terminate: The Complete Murder Inc.
Nina Nastasia – Dogs (re-released 2004)
Neutrino – Motion Picture Soundtrack
Chevelle – Point #1
Various Artists – Poor Little Knitter on the Road: A Tribute to the Kni
The Sadies – Pure Diamond Gold
Low – Secret Name
Don Caballero – Singles Breaking Up (Vol. 1) (uncredited, five songs only)
Ativin – Summing the Approach
Pezz – Warmth & Sincerity
Hosemobile – What Can & Can't Go On
Jon Spencer Blues Explosion – Xtra Acme USA (seven songs only)
Dragbody – Flip The Kill Switch
New Brutalism – A Diagram Without Scale Or Dimension
Pugs – Chimato Kubiki

2000s
2000
Will Oldham & Rian Murphy – All Most Heaven
Various Artists – Best Anthems... Ever!
Cinerama – Disco Volante
Don Caballero – American Don (credited only as "the proprietor" of Electrical Audio)
Silkworm – Lifestyle
Jon Spencer Blues Explosion – "Magical Colours" b/w "Confused" single
Shannon Wright – Maps of Tacit 
Neurosis – Sovereign
Man or Astro-man? – A Spectrum of Infinite Scale
Flogging Molly – Swagger
The Bomb – Torch Songs
Caesar – Leaving Sparks
Robbie Fulks – Very Best of Robbie Fulks
Destro 1 – Start the whole mechanical sequence
Dianogah – Battle Champions
High Dependency Unit -Fire Works
2001
Early Lines – Hate the Living, Love the Dead
Zeni Geva – 10,000 Light Years
Robbie Fulks – 13 Hillbilly Giants
The Bottletones – Adult Time
Meat Joy – Between the Devil and the Deep
Robbie Fulks – Couples in Trouble
Whitehouse – Cruise (track "Public" only)
Joan of Arse – Distant Hearts, a Little Closer
The Ex – Dizzy Spells
Shannon Wright – Dyed in the Wool
The Traitors – Everything Went Shit: Lost and Collected Tracks
Ballydowse – Out Of The Fertile Crescent
Danielson Famile – Fetch the Compass Kids
Labradford – Fixed::Context
Cinerama – "Health and Efficiency"
Double Life – III Song EP
XBXRX – Gop Ist Minee
Chestnut Station – In Your Living Room
Mogwai – "My Father My King"
The New Year – Newness Ends
Owls – Owls
Hero of a Hundred Fights – The Remote, the Cold
Various Artists – Rough Trade Shops: 25 Years
Neurosis – A Sun That Never Sets
Low – Things We Lost in the Fire
Sonna – We Sing Loud Sing Soft Tonight
Edith Frost – Wonder Wonder 
Point 22 – Worker
Loraxx – Yellville
Rye Coalition – ZZ Topless/Snowjob
Honey for Petzi – Heal All Monsters
fra-foa – chuuno-fuchi (three songs only)
The Black Lungs (Michigan band, not the Canadian band of the same name) – unreleased album
Technician – Opposition EP
2002
Various Artists – All Tomorrow's Parties 2.0: Shellac Curated
Glen Meadmore – Cowboy Songs for Little Hustlers
Nina Nastasia – Blackened Air
Flogging Molly – Drunken Lullabies
Jawbreaker – Etc.
Plush – Fed
Goatsnake/Burning Witch – Goatsnake/Burning Witch
Silkworm – Italian Platinum
Giddy Motors – Make It Pop
Mclusky – Mclusky Do Dallas
Various Artists – Membranaphonics
Rye Coalition – On Top
Portastatic – Perfect Little Door
Milemarker – Satanic Versus
The Quarterhorse – I was on fire for you
Bellini – Snowing Sun
Sonic Mook Experiment – Sonic Mook Experiment 2: Future Rock & Roll
Beachbuggy – Sport Fury
The Ghost – This Is a Hospital
Bloodlet – Three Humid Nights in the Cypress Trees
Vermillion – Flattening Mountains and Creating Empires
The Breeders – Title TK
Cinerama – Torino
Cordelia's Dad – What It Is
Adrian Crowley – When You Are Here You Are Family
Godspeed You! Black Emperor – Yanqui U.X.O.
54-71 – enClorox
Zu – Igneo
Dionysos – Western sous la neige
Dead Man Ray – Cago
Jon Spencer Blues Explosion – Plastic Fang
Nirvana – Nirvana (Recorded Four Songs)
Brick Layer Cake – Whatchamacallit
2003
Sylvan  –  The Ugly Lemon
Early Lines – Pure Health
Subersive – Antihero
Cinerama – Cinerama Holiday
Ring, Cicada – Good Morning Mr. Good
The Heavils – Heavils
Original Score – Hell House
Scout Niblett – I Am
Valina – Vagabond
The Forms – Icarus
Duenow – If You Could Only See What They Are Doing to You
Cheer-Accident – Introducing Lemon
Songs: Ohia – The Magnolia Electric Co.
Pepito – Migrante
Dysrhythmia – Pretest
The Frames – The Roads Outgrown
Nina Nastasia – Run to Ruin
Sonna – Smile and the World Smiles with You
Cheap Trick – Special One
The Desert Fathers – Spirituality
F-Minus – Sweating Blood
Transit Belle – Transit Belle
F-Minus – Wake Up Screaming
Rope – Widow's First Dawn
Various Artists – Wig in a Box
Federation X – X Patriot
Purplene – Purplene
The Hidden – Hymnal EP
Red Swan – Michigan Blood Games
12Twelve – Speritismo
Chevreuil – Chateauvallon
Whitehouse – Bird Seed (title track only)
A Whisper in the Noise – Through the Ides of March
Berkeley – Hopes, Prayers and Bubblegum
Three Second Kiss – Music out of Music
Uncommonmenfrommars – Kill the Fuze
2004
yourcodenameis:milo – All Roads to Fault
Living Things – Black Skies in Broad Daylight
mclusky – The Difference Between Me and You Is That I'm Not on Fire
Neurosis – The Eye of Every Storm
Bear Claw – Find The Sun
Leftöver Crack – Fuck World Trade
Various Artists – How Soon Is Now?: The Songs of the Smiths By...
Living Things – I Owe
Silkworm – It'll Be Cool
Haymarket Riot – Mog
Various Artists – Neurot Recordings
Various Artists – No Depression: What It Sounds Like, Vol. 1
Shannon Wright – Over the Sun
0.22 – Patriots
Electrelane – The Power Out
Various Artists – TRR50: Thank You
The Ex – Turn
Amber – Putting All the Pieces Together
La Habitación Roja – Nuevos Tiempos
Plush – Underfed
Helmet – Unsung: The Best of Helmet (1991–1997)
Scout Niblett – Uptown Top Ranking
Mono – Walking Cloud and Deep Red Sky, Flag Fluttered and the Sun Shined
Pixies – Wave of Mutilation: Best of Pixies
Saeta – We Are Waiting All for Hope
Chauncey – My Radio (Everything I Know)
Nirvana – With the Lights Out
Wrangler Brutes – Zulu
Bright Channel – Bright Channel
Phillip Roebuck – One-man band
Senator – United Wire
2005
Living Things – Ahead of the Lions
BANG sugar BANG – Victory Gin
Electrelane – Axes
Kash – Beauty Is Everywhere/Kash
High on Fire – Blessed Black Wings
Terry Stamp – Bootlace Johnnie & The Ninety-Nines
The Ponys – Celebration Castle
Gogol Bordello – East Infection
The Hidden – Smash to Ashes
Gogol Bordello – Gypsy Punks: Underdog World Strike
Wonderful Smith – Hello, It's Wonderful
Jaks – Here Lies the Body of Jaks
Scout Niblett – Kidnapped by Neptune
The Patsys – On The 13th Kick
Make Believe – Shock of Being
Bellini – Small Stones
Magnolia Electric Co – What Comes After the Blues
Cinerama – Don't Touch That Dial
Spy – Spy
From Fiction – Bloodwork
Boxes – Bad Blood
Die! Die! Die! -Die! Die! Die!
Loraxx – Selfs
2006
This Moment in Black History – It Takes a Nation of Assholes to Hold Us Back
Jinx Titanic – Stuporstardom!
The Cape May – Glass Mountain Roads
Cougars – Pillow Talk
Sparrklejet – Beyond the Beyond
Two Minute Warning – Short Stories On Super-Eight
Mise en Place – Innit
Mono – You Are There
New Grenada – Modern Problems
Zao – The Fear Is What Keeps Us Here
Joanna Newsom – Ys
12Twelve – L'Univers
Nina Nastasia – On Leaving
The Time Of The Assassins – Awake In Slumberland
The Hidden – Winged Wolves
Made Out of Babies – Coward
Marty Casey and Lovehammers – Marty Casey and Lovehammers (album)
Cheap Trick – Rockford
Born Again Floozies – 7 Deadly Sinners
Living Things – Bom Bom Bom (single)
Chevreuil – (((Capoëira)))
Chevreuil – Science
The Sadies – Live Vol.1
Gasoline Heart – You Know Who You Are
Phillip Roebuck – Fever Pitch
Uzeda – Stella
Childproof – Original Copy
2007
Second Echo
Iggy & the Stooges – The Weirdness
Fun – Zu-Pa!
Orchid Trip – Orchid Trip
Alamos – Captain Indifferent says, "Whatever"
Chingalera – In the Shadow of the Black Palm Tree
Moutheater – Lot Lizard
stuffy/the fuses – Angels Are Ace
Hot Little Rocket – How to Lose Everything
Weedeater – God Luck and Good Speed
A Whisper In The Noise – Dry Land
Nina Nastasia & Jim White – You Follow Me
The Conformists – Three Hundred
Om – Pilgrimage
Valina – a tempo! a tempo!
Scout Niblett – This Fool Can Die Now
The Judas Goats – Cold Creases E.P.
The Forms – st
Stinking Lizaveta – Scream of the Iron Iconoclast
Phonovectra – Too Young To Die
Neurosis – Given to the Rising
Bear Claw – Slow Speed: Deep Owls
2008
Aloke – I Moved Here to Live
Esquimaux – Tiger
The Breeders – Mountain Battles
My Disco – Paradise
Over Vert – Gagging and Swallowing
Popular Workshop – We're Alive And We're Not Alone
Scott Weiland – "Happy" in Galoshes
The Pale Figures – Memphis and Chicago
Nations Of Fire – If It Swings, We've Got It!
Room 101 – The Pitch
Trash Talk – Trash Talk
ALiX – Good 1
The Wedding Present – El Rey
Haymarket Riot – Endless Bummer
54-71 – I'm not fine thank you, and you?
Three second kiss – Long Distance Runner
Vitamin X – Full Scale Assault
Ranheim – I Don't Like The Smiths EP
Ranheim – Norwegian Wood
Precore – Sick
Born Again Floozies – street music, 13 Rebellions and a Song of Consolation
The Provocative Whites – EVOLYM (released April 2009)
2009
Mono – Hymn to the Immortal Wind
Manic Street Preachers – Journal for Plague Lovers
Umphrey's McGee – Mantis
Stella Peel – Stella Peel
Jarvis Cocker – Further Complications
Minto – Lay It On Me
Delby L – Nine Skies
The Thing – Bag It!
PRE – Hope Freaks
Magnolia Electric Co. – Josephine
Drug Mountain – Drug Mountain
Motorpsycho – Child of the Future
Berri Txarrak – Payola
Om – God Is Good
Pixies – Minotaur (box set of Pixies previous albums)
Tunica Dartos – Sound Buffet (released January 2011)
Årabrot – The Brother Seed
Kingskin – Slug
Leila Adu – Dark Joan
The Marder – Men's Ruin EP

2010s
2010
Brent Newman & The Broken Arrows – Before The Revolution
Scout Niblett – The Calcination of Scout Niblett
Bella Clava – The Craic
The Ex – Catch My Shoe
Nina Nastasia – Outlaster
The Bats Pajamas – The Bats Pajamas
Grandfather – Why I'd Try
My Disco – Little Joy
The Conformists – None Hundred
Avitia – Windowsmashers and Safecrackers
Ferocious Fucking Teeth – Ferocious Fucking Teeth
Tubelord – Tezcatlipōca
Old Man Lady Luck
2011
The Gary – El Camino
Let's Wrestle – Nursing Home
Senium – Such Progress
Azimyth – Azimyth
Bear Claw – Refuse This Gift
The Crooked Fiddle Band – Overgrown Tales
Sleepwalks – The Milk Has Gone Sour
Joan of Arc – Life Like
Monotonix – Not Yet (album)
Weedeater – Jason...The Dragon
Candelilla – Heart Mutter (released February 2013)
Ghosts in the Valley – Clockpunchers (released May 2012)
2012
We Are Knuckle Dragger – Tit for Tat
Cloud Nothings – Attack on Memory
China – Pussy LP
The Cribs – In The Belly of the Brazen Bull
Screaming Females – Ugly
Younger – TBA
A Banquet – Breath
Teeth – The Strain
Cold Fur (ex Rye Coalition & The Want) – Altamont Every Night
Colin Tyler – Live From Studio A
Bonnie 'Prince' Billy – Now Here's My Plan (EP)
Ominous Black – Self titled (EP)
Thom Bowden – TBA
Neurosis – Honor Found in Decay
Vitamin X – About To Crack
Hugh Cornwell – Totem And Taboo
Thinning the Herd – Freedom From the Known
Alexi Martov – Scent of a Wolf
2013
Man or Astro-man? – Defcon 5 4 3 2 1
Goddard – 10-inch (with Giraffes? Giraffes!)
The Crooked Fiddle Band – Moving Pieces Of The Sea
Saything – Nonsense
The Seething Coast – Olympia
STNNNG – Empire Inward
Robert Rolfe Feddersen – American Loser
P.K.14 – 1984
2014
 Brent Newman & The Broken Arrows – Hot Blood
 Blind Butcher – Albino
 D3AD BY MONDAY – Memento Mori
 Captain Blood – Captain Blood
 Esben and the Witch – A New Nature
 Foxy Shazam – Gonzo
 Screaming Females – Live at the Hideout
 Valina – Container
2015
 Conduct – Fear and Desire
 The Conformists – DIVORCE
 Raketkanon – RKTKN#2
 KEN mode – Success
 WOMPS – Live a Little Less/Dreams on Demand
 Steve Taylor and the Danielson Foil – Wow to the Deadness
 Weedeater – Goliathan
 Screaming Females – Rose Mountain
 Subsurfer – La La La
 Hex Horizontal– Electric Fence
 Yonatan Gat – Physical Copy
2016
 Alpha Strategy – Drink the Brine, Get Scarce
 Womps – Our fertile forever
 Cocaine Piss – Sex Weirdos 7-inch
 Cocaine Piss – The Dancer
 Valina – In Position
 Peter Squires – When I Couldn't Move
 Robbie Fulks – Upland Stories
 Neurosis – Fires Within Fires
 The Conformists – Divorce
 Karabas Barabas – Return of the Sexy Demon
 Kapitan Korsakov – Physical Violence is the Least of My Priorities
 Vomitface – Hooray for Me
 Descartes a Kant – Victims Of Love Propaganda
 Malojian - This Is Nowhere
 Mono – Requiem For Hell
 Dazzling Killmen – Face of Collapse: Special Edition (25th Anniversary reissue)
 Chris Cobilis (performed by Spektral Quartet and Kenneth Goldsmith) – This Is You
 Sex Snobs – Emotional Stuffing
 KEN mode – Nerve (ep) track 1-4
2017
Ty Segall – Ty Segall
Meat Wave – The Incessant
The Oxford Coma - Everything Out of Tune
STNNNG – Veterans of Pleasure
Descartes a Kant– Victims Of Love Propaganda
METZ - Strange Peace
Andy Pratt — Horizon Disrupted
Ben Frost — The Centre Cannot Hold
2018
The Breeders – All Nerve
Spare Snare - Sounds Recorded by Steve Albini
 Signal the Launch - Dance Like a Vampire
 Elias Black - Reclamation
 GEZAN — Silence Will Speak
 Super Unison – Stella
 Alpha Strategy - The Gurgler
Meat Wave - The Incessant
 Andy Pratt - Further Disruption (EP)
 Control Group - It's the year 2000!
2019
 Mono - Nowhere Now Here
 Sunn O))) - Life Metal
 Sunn O))) - Pyroclasts
 Triliteral - Flying Snake's Claw
 Frank Iero and the Future Violents - Barriers
 Doblecapa - La Felpa
 Uzeda - Quocumque jeceris stabit
 Décibelles - Rock Français
 Asylums - Genetic Cabaret
 DBOY - (Unknown)
Ty Segall & Freedom Band - Deforming Lobes
 Black Orchids - Sakura Sorrow
 Austero - Austero
 Local H - Lifers

2020s
2020
 Medusa - In Bed with Medusa
 Glasgow - Glasgow EP (Mix Only)
 Karabas Barabas - Degenerate National Anthem
 dave the band - Slob Stories
 Fuzz - III
 Laura Jane Grace - Stay Alive
 Living Things - Shapeshifter
 Asylums - Genetic Cabaret
 Lil BUB: The Band - Lil BUB (EP)

2021
 Racing The Sun - Epidemic of Love
 Mono - Pilgrimage of the soul
 Spare Snare – Sounds
 Ativin – Austere
2022
 CREEPSCIENCE - Shift the Paradigm
 Cat's Eyes - Night and Soul
 Nina Nastasia - Just Stay in Bed
 Corduroy Cat - 10% Hopeful
 Black Midi - live at electric audio recorded by Steve Albini. (6 different songs on Flexi Discs as bonus to their Hellfire album)
 Mikey Erg - Love at Leeds
Meet Cute - "Party Mind"

Spoken word
"Spoken Word Thing" Sub Pop 100 (Sub Pop, 1986) - Various artist compilation

References

 
Discographies of American artists
Production discographies
Rock music discographies